Hongxian may refer to:

Red thread of fate or hongxian in Chinese
Hongxian (short story) (紅線; literally: Red String), a Chinese legend about a female assassin named "Hongxian"
Hongxian (洪憲), era name of Yuan Shikai's reign as Chinese Emperor